Indian Institute of Petroleum and Energy (IIPE), is an institute of national importance  established in 2016, in Visakhapatnam, Andhra Pradesh. Indian Institute of Petroleum and Energy (IIPE), Visakhapatnam, a domain-specific Institute at par with IITs and IIMs, is established by the Government of India under the aegis of the Ministry of Petroleum and Natural Gas (MoPNG) in the year 2016. The Indian Institute of Petroleum and Energy Act, 2017 (No.3 of 2018) enacted by the Parliament and declared the Institute as an 'Institution of National Importance'. 

The university has been allotted  of land in Vangali Village, near Sabbavaram mandal, Vishakhapatnam. IIPE has collaborated with oil majors like HPCL, IOCL, ONGC, GAIL, OIL, OIDB, BPCL, and the Ministry of Industry and Commerce. The Institute presently offers 4-year B.Tech courses in Petroleum Engineering and Chemical Engineering based on JEE (Advanced) rankings and Ph.D. programmes. The curriculum of the Institute is domain specialized and in line with the needs of the industries. The faculty of the Institute are from various IITs across the country, having very high academic credentials, research base, and international exposure.

The Minister of State (I/C) for Petroleum & Natural Gas, Shri Dharmendra Pradhan launched the website of Indian Institute of Petroleum & Energy (IIPE), Visakhapatnam on 27 May 2016

The first batch of Petroleum and Chemical Engineering commenced from the first week of August 2016. As of now, the maximum intake capacity for each course is 50 seats.

Admission Criteria 
 A candidate should have cleared JEE Advanced to seek admission in IIPE.
 Along with IITs and RGIPT, IIPE takes admissions based on ranks in JEE Advanced.
 The candidate should have 75% minimum aggregate marks (70% in case of SC/ST/Physical Disability) in class 12th or equivalent.

MoU 
 IIT Kharagpur will be playing a role of a mentor for IIPE till 2019. The institute will be guided through the admissions, student registrations, forming academic regulation, curriculum, and faculty related disciplines of Petroleum and Chemical Engineering.
 Andhra University will be helping the deemed university with the infrastructure and resources. Since the construction of the new campus will take five to six years it will be a temporary campus. The first batch that is started in the first week of August will have their classes in Andhra University's main building, College of Engineering. The students will have full access to their facilities and resources like laboratories, e-library, Wi-Fi, etc.
 The University of Houston recently signed a memorandum of understanding (MoU) with the Indian Institute of Petroleum and Energy (IIPE). This MoU aims to build scientific and technical knowledge through joint research, as well as equip students at both institutions with skills and knowledge so they can compete in the dynamic energy industry.
 Academic MoU has been signed between Texas A & M University, USA and IIPE. The primary objectives are to promote interaction and collaboration between faculty, staff, and students of the two institutions through visits and faculty exchange programs, carry out academic and research programs, joint monitoring of students. The relationship also aims at enhancing the technological, social, and cultural bondage between two Nations.

See also
 Rajiv Gandhi Institute of Petroleum Technology
  Institutes of National Importance

References 

 Engineering colleges in Andhra Pradesh
 Universities and colleges in Visakhapatnam
 Energy education
 Educational institutions established in 2016
2016 establishments in Andhra Pradesh